UTV is a Romanian free-to-air music television channel located in Bucharest owned by RCS & RDS S.A.. It was launched in late 2005 under the slogan "All I want for Christmas is U". It belonged to UTI GROUP, but was later sold to RCS RDS. It is mainly broadcast in clubs and restaurants, but also has a target for 18–35 years public, broadcasting new and recent music, Romanian and foreign, mainly dance, club, house.

It was also available as U HD, with Dolby Audio, until 2014. UTV mainly broadcasts new music, while H!T music channel, another RCS RDS channel, broadcasts older music from the 1960s to the present.

References

External links 
Official Site

Television stations in Romania
Television channels and stations established in 2005